Kepler-1658b (or the Kepler object of interest, KOI-4.01) is a hot Jupiter, a type of gas giant exoplanet, that orbits an F-type star called Kepler 1658, located about 2629 light-years away from the Solar System. It is the first planet identified by the Kepler space telescope after its launch in 2009, but later ruled out as false alarm since its transit could not be confirmed. A study published in 2019 established it as a planet, describing it as "the closest known planet in terms of orbital period to an evolved star." Analysis of the Transiting Exoplanet Survey Satellite (TESS) data in 2022 showed that it is gradually spiraling into its star.

History 
Named after German astronomer Johannes Kepler, the Kepler space telescope was launched by NASA in 2009 to discover planets orbiting other stars. In June 2010, data of the first observations were publicly announced that 705 stars indicated exoplanet candidates. In January 2011, identification of 305 stars as containing planets was published as the Kepler Input Catalogue. The planets were designated as the Kepler object of interest (KOI). An F-type star KOI-4 was among the observed exoplanetary system. Before 2009, KOI-1 to KOI-3 were already known as possible exoplanet bearing stars. KOI-4.01 was thus the first exoplanet identified by the Kepler.

KOI-4.01 was seen as blocking a bit of starlight from the KOI-4, which indicated that it was a transiting planet. The size of KOI-4 was estimated to be slightly larger than the Sun, by about 1.1 times, with its planet about the size of Neptune. A secondary eclipse was observed that still showed a dip in starlight. Such dip was not expected to be coming for a planet as small as KOI-4.01. The identification of planet was ruled out as a false alarm.

In 2016, Ashley Chontos, then a first-year graduate student at the University of Hawaiʻi in Honolulu, started analysing the Kepler data. She and her collaborators confirmed in February 2019 that KOI-4.01 is a real planet, a hot Jupiter. Chontos announced it on 5 March at NASA’s Kepler & K2 science conference in Glendale, California, and published it on 29 April in The Astronomical Journal. The study described it as "the closest known planet in terms of orbital period to an evolved star" and an "insight into theories for hot Jupiter formation and migration." The planet was named Kepler-1658b, referring to the entry number in the Kepler Input Catalogue. After running out of fuel, the Kepler space telescope terminated in 2018, and the study was taken over by the Transiting Exoplanet Survey Satellite (TESS).

Description 
KOI-4 is about 2.9 times the size of the Sun, and not 1.1 times larger as initially estimated. This estimate makes Kepler-1658b larger than Neptune, about 1.07 the size of Jupiter, with a mass of 5.88 Jupiters. Kepler-1658b is gas giant exoplanet, a type of hot Jupiter. It takes 3.8 Earth-days to complete one orbit around its star.

TESS observations published in 2022 showed that Kepler-1658b has a decreasing orbital period at a rate of about  milliseconds per year and is spiralling into its star due to tidal deceleration, at which rate it will be consumed in around 2.5 million years. This is the second discovery of any planet whose orbit is decaying and heading for destruction towards its own star, after WASP-12b. Scientists said that such process could explain how other planets, including the Earth, would end in the course of their host stars evolving to the giant star phase.

References 

Exoplanets discovered by the Kepler space telescope
Transiting exoplanets
Kepler objects of interest
Exoplanets discovered in 2019